The name Madeline has been used for nine tropical cyclones in the Eastern Pacific Ocean and one in the Western Pacific Ocean.

In the Eastern Pacific:
 Tropical Depression Madeline (1961) – downgraded in post-analysis, should not have been named.
 Tropical Storm Madeline (1968) – never threatened land.
 Hurricane Madeline (1976) – Made landfall near Zihuatanejo, causing heavy damage.
 Tropical Storm Madeline (1980) – short-lived storm, stayed out to sea.
 Tropical Storm Madeline (1986) – not a threat to land.
 Tropical Storm Madeline (1992) – stayed out to sea.
 Hurricane Madeline (1998) – threatened Islas Marías and parts of Mexico before dissipating, caused no damage.
 Hurricane Madeline (2016) – threatened Hawaii but took a different route just before approaching the islands.
 Tropical Storm Madeline (2022) – caused some damage as it moved along the coast of southwestern Mexico. 

In the Western Pacific:
 Typhoon Madeline (1949) (T4912)

Pacific hurricane set index articles
Pacific typhoon set index articles